Beverley Turner (born 21 October 1973) is an English television and radio presenter.

Early life
Turner was born in Prestwich, Lancashire. She has a first class degree in English Literature and Language from the University of Manchester. She is the sister of Olympic swimmer Adrian Turner and of the executive producer of The Apprentice, Cal Turner.

Career
Turner worked for BBC Radio 5 Live, presenting their Bump Club series, following a group of pregnant women through their journey to motherhood. Previously, she spent three years as one of only two female presenters for ITV's Formula One coverage and also presented coverage of the Tour de France. She broke with Formula One racing coverage with a "bridge burning exercise" in the form of her book, The Pits: The Real World of Formula 1 in July 2004, which described widespread sexism in the sport. She spent another three seasons presenting coverage of US National Basketball Association games in the UK. In 2002 she began presenting entertainment sections for Granada's This Morning and, in 2003, travel reporting for the Travel Channel.

She was the sole presenter of sixty-four episodes of Taste, a cooking programme for Sky1 which was shown daily for six years across global Sky Channels and became one of the station's most profitable self-made shows. She co-presented Homes Live with Watchdogs Matt Allwright, a daily, live property show on BBC Two.

Turner hosted her own talk show on the radio station LBC from 2015 to 2019, and at the time of her departure was one of two female presenters at the station. She left the station in January 2019 after complaining that the station predominantly employed white men; LBC reported that her contract had expired and was not renewed.

From November 2022, Turner began hosting her own weekday show on GB News, titled Bev Turner Today. She had previously been a stand-in presenter on the channel.

She has written for newspapers The Independent, The Daily Telegraph and the Daily Mail.

Controversies
On 1 June 2021, Turner clashed with Dermot O'Leary on This Morning over the issue of COVID-19 vaccines, when she said that it was not effective and urged younger people to refuse the vaccine when offered it. She went on to claim: "It does not stop you catching or passing on the virus." Following this, she was banned from appearing on the programme. Controversy continued later on Jeremy Vine, which caused the Ofcom to receive hundreds of complaints. She later shared a video of herself crying, claiming she had been "ambushed." On November of the same year she appeared again on the Jeremy Vine programme, in which she clashed with Owen Jones when she compared Austria's lockdown rules for the non-vaccinated to Apartheid.

On 7 February 2022, in the hours after Labour leader Sir Keir Starmer was encircled by protesters yelling "traitor", with references to Jimmy Savile, amongst other things, Turner tweeted to suggest that Sir Keir Starmer was complicit in the incident and that the event was staged. Turner tweeted: "I'm not at all convinced this is a genuine 'ambush.' It perfectly casts Johnson as a Trumpian agitator. (I'm not condoning his Savile comment. It was stupid). But Starmer does not look scared. Yelling about 'Freemasons' was brainstormed in a board room! Why walk so far?! Staged."

In July 2022, amidst the 2022 United Kingdom heat wave, in a conversation with BBC's meteorologist John Hammond, she said "I want us to be happy about the weather, and I don’t know if something has happened to meteorologists to make you all a little bit fatalistic and harbingers of doom, but broadcasters – particularly on the BBC – every time I’ve turned on, anyone is talking about the weather and they’re saying there’s going to be tons of fatalities, but haven't we always had hot weather, John?" in a moment that was compared to the film Don%27t Look Up. On her Twitter, she has expressed her opinion about the extreme heat warnings, calling them "weather-fear porn" and "climate lockdown."

Personal life

Turner married double Olympic Gold medallist rower James Cracknell at Clearwell Castle in Gloucestershire in 2002. They have a son, born in September 2003, and two daughters,  born in March 2009 and April 2011. They announced their separation in April 2019.

Cracknell was injured in a cycling accident in July 2010 whilst filming for The Discovery Channel and sustained a personality-altering traumatic brain injury. The pair wrote about his recovery in the book Touching Distance which was published in 2012.

Other interests
Turner's main charity interest is in sexual health and sexual politics, and she is a patron of the Family Planning Association (FPA). She is also an honorary associate of the National Secular Society.

She has been a competitive swimmer, and appeared in FHMs "Sexiest Women" list at position 43 in 2001. Turner has also studied for a Diploma in Psychotherapy and Hypnotherapy.

References

External links 
 
 
 Travel Channel | Presenter – Beverley Turner Postcards from Paradise profile
 NBA.com UK One on One with Beverly  Turner Chat interview transcript from Sunday, 11 March 2001.
 The Observer | Review | 'I felt trapped in this world of horrible men'  Review of her book, 'The Pits'
 Beverley Turner Showreel Created by Burning Vision

1973 births
Living people
Alumni of the Victoria University of Manchester
English radio presenters
English television presenters
English non-fiction writers
Formula One journalists and reporters
GB News newsreaders and journalists
People from Prestwich